Braeview Academy is a secondary school in Dundee, Scotland.  Situated on top of a steep hill (brae), it was originally named Whitfield High School. It was damaged in a fire on 11 September 2018, which destroyed around half of the building. 

In 2021, Dundee City Council decided to merge Braeview  with the nearby Craigie High School with a new community campus on the site of the former St Saviour's High School which is to open in 2025.

Houses

The school is divided into 3 main houses: McManus, Law and Discovery. Each house is served by a Depute Rector, and also House Captains which are chosen every year.

McManus: House Colour: burgundy, Head of House: Mr Carkson
Discovery: House Colour: blue, Head of House: Mrs Telfer 
Law: House Colour:blue, Head of House: Mrs McPherson

Former pupils

Charlie Adam, footballer for Dundee FC 
Garry Kenneth, footballer
John McGlashan (footballer), born 1967
Eddie Mair, broadcaster
Scott Robertson

External links
 Braeview Academy Website
HMIE Report
 Braeview Academy's page on Scottish Schools Online

References

Secondary schools in Dundee
1976 establishments in Scotland
Educational institutions established in 1976